Terry Nelson Skinner (born August 24, 1947) is an American former disc jockey from Russellville, Alabama, United States. Together with a group of studio musicians, Nelson released a single in 1971 under the name C. Company featuring Terry Nelson. The single, entitled "Battle Hymn of Lt. Calley", was a spoken-word recording with a musical background which defended William Calley and the massacre at My Lai, for which Calley was court-martialed in 1970–71. Originally issued on a small local label, Quickit Records, it was reissued nationally on Plantation Records in April 1971. The single reached No. 37 on the Billboard Hot 100 charts and No. 49 on Hot Country Songs.

This disc sold over one million copies in just four days, and received a gold disc awarded by the Recording Industry Association of America on 15 April 1971. It went on to sell nearly two million copies.

That same year, C. Company and Terry Nelson released an album, Wake Up America, also on Plantation.

References

Bibliography
Joel Whitburn, The Billboard Book of Top 40 Hits. 7th edn, 2000,

External links
Terry Nelson Alabama Music Hall of Fame

1947 births
American radio DJs
Musicians from Alabama
People from Russellville, Alabama
Living people